Hayes or Hayes Station is a former settlement in Fresno County, California. The Panoche road exit on I-5 (Exit 368) lies about one mile ENE of the location.

A post office operated at Hayes from 1893 to 1902. The place was named for its first postmaster, William J. Hayes.

Murderer James Dunham was seen near Hayes station in June 1896.

References

Former settlements in Fresno County, California
Former populated places in California